The Lark is a 1958 Australian TV version of the 1952 Jean Anouilh play of the same title.

According to The Age it opened "a new era in TV drama production in Melbourne."

Plot
At the trial of Joan of Arc, events are shown in flashback as to how she came to rebel against the English.

Cast
Beverly Dunn as Joan of Arc
Frank Gatliff as Cauchon
Christopher Hill as Warwick
Robert Peach as the Inquisitor
Jeffrey Hodgson as the Dauphin
John Morgan as the Promoter
Moira Carleton as Joan's mother
Mary Ward as Queen Yolande, the Dauphin's mother-in-law
Laura Jane Casson as Agnes Sorel, as the Dauphin's mistress
Carol Potter as the little Queen, wife of the Dauphin
Keith Hudson as Ladvenu
Ilka Brand as the Dauphin's page
Brin Newton-John as the Archbishop of Rheims
John Royle as narrator
Henry Cuthbertson as voice of Archangel

Production
The production was based on a play which debuted in 1955 in a production starring Leo McKern and Dorothy Tutin.

Director William Sterling said he worked on the production "for some months" and promised some "controversial surprises" in the play.

It was shot in Melbourne using a cast of 24 and seven sets which occupied the entire 60 ft by 80 ft of Melbourne's Studio 32, one of the largest studios in Melbourne. Historical research to ensure authenticity of sets and costumes was carried out by designer Jon Peters.

It starred Beverly Dunn as Joan. Dunn had played the role in Melbourne Little Theatre in 1956. She did 55 hours of rehearsals. Dunn would play the role again on radio for the BBC in 1961.

It was broadcast in a series of "live" dramas on Sunday night on ABV-2 Melbourne. In order, they were The Governess, The Last Call, The Rose without a Thorn, The Lark, Citizen of Westminster, and Enemy of the People (the last of "the season").

Reception
The Melbourne broadcast was recorded and shown at a meeting of the Australian Television Society, which Sterling attended. The members praised Beverly Dunn's acting but some thought the final burning scene could be more realistic. Sterling said some of the lighting effects were entirely new to Australian TV and said he was happy with the production "except for minor faults which few other viewers would notice anyway."

References

External links
The Lark at IMDb

Australian television films
Australian Broadcasting Corporation original programming
English-language television shows
Australian live television shows
Black-and-white Australian television shows
1950s Australian television plays
Films directed by William Sterling (director)
Films based on works by Jean Anouilh